Indapur railway station is a railway station on Konkan Railway line of Indian Railways. It is located at indapur village near the town of Mangaon in the Raigad district of Maharashtra. It is at a distance of  down from northern end of Konkan Railways. The previous station on the line is Kolad railway station and the succeeding station is Mangaon railway station.

As of April 2018, no express trains halt at Indapur.  It is served by Diva–Ratnagiri  Passenger trains.

References

Ratnagiri railway division
Railway stations in Raigad district